Graham Andrew Crawford (born 16 October 1967) is a former English cricketer.  Crawford was a right-handed batsman who bowled right-arm off break.  He was born in Windlesham, Surrey.

Crawford represented the Surrey Cricket Board in 2 List A cricket matches against Norfolk and Cheshire in the 1999 NatWest Trophy.  In his 2 List A matches, he scored 71 runs at a batting average of 35.50, with a high score of 41.  With the ball he took 2 wickets at a bowling average of 15.50, with best figures of 2/31.

References

External links
Graham Crawford at Cricinfo
Graham Crawford at CricketArchive

1967 births
Living people
People from Surrey Heath (district)
People from Surrey
English cricketers
Surrey Cricket Board cricketers